Mekoni, also Mehoni (Ge'ez: መኾኒ or መሆኒ), is a town in the Tigray Region of Ethiopia. "Mekoni" (pronounced as 'Me-koni') is located at 657 km north of Addis Ababa along Ethiopian Highway 2 which runs to Mekelle  (the capital city of Tigray region), Adigrat, Aksum, Shire and Humera with an altitude of 2479 m.

Economy 
The town's economy is agriculturally focused. In recent years, there have been construction of irrigated and terraced farming in order to fight  desertification.

References

Populated places in the Tigray Region